Darwin Espinal (born 16 January 1995) is a Honduran professional footballer who currently plays as a midfielder for Maryland Bobcats in the National Independent Soccer Association.

Career

College and Youth
Espinal was born in Tegucigalpa, Honduras, though his family moved Washington DC, Espinal and family later moved to Broward County, Florida where he played high school soccer for J. P. Taravella High School. While at Taravella, Espinal was named the 2012–2013 Florida Class 5A-4A Player of the Year. Espinal also enjoyed success at the club level in Broward, playing for Plantation FC. Espinal led Plantation to the Florida State Cup Championship and a spot in the Region III Championship, where he was named tournament MVP.

Coming out of high school, Espinal had an offer to join the Chicago Fire SC Academy, but he opted to go to college at Albany, Georgia's Darton State College. In his freshman season as a Darton Cavalier, Espinal scored 23 goals and notched 10 assists in just 16 games. During his 2014 sophomore season, Espinal continued his impressive form, scoring 29 goals with 19 assists in 19 games. He was a 1st Team NJCAA All-American both years and helped the Cavaliers win the Region 17 Championship in 2014. His 52 goals and 81 points were both good for school records.

Tampa Bay Rowdies
On 23 December 2014 it was announced that Espinal had signed his first professional contract with the Tampa Bay Rowdies of the North American Soccer League. During the Rowdies preseason tour of Portugal ahead of their 2015 campaign, Espinal scored goals against the 'B' teams of S.L. Benfica and Sporting CP.

Espinal's strong preseason performance earned him a spot in Coach Thomas Rongen's starting eleven for the Rowdies first match of the 2015 season against the San Antonio Scorpions. Espinal cashed in on the opportunity, scoring a goal in first half stoppage time off an assist by Darnell King.

South Florida Surf

In 2017, Espinal signed on to play with the South Florida Surf of the Premier Development League. For three weeks, Espinal was listed as the PDL's top prospect.

Reno 1868 FC

On June 21, 2017, it was announced that Espinal had signed with Reno 1868 FC of the USL in a one-year deal. He scored his first goal for the team on July 3 in its historic 9–0 rout of LA Galaxy II; Espinal's 88th-minute strike, Reno's ninth of the game, set the league record for largest margin of victory. He was one of five Reno players called up by the San Jose Earthquakes, Reno's Major League Soccer affiliate, to play in its July 14 friendly against Eintracht Frankfurt, and made his first appearance for the club off the bench during the 4–1 victory in the 33rd minute for Danny Hoesen.

International career
Espinal was called up to represent Honduras for the 2015 CONCACAF Men's Olympic Qualifying Championship in the United States.

Personal life 
Darwin's younger brother, Isaac is also a professional footballer, and currently plays for Loudoun United FC in USL Championship.

References

External links 
 Tampa Bay Rowdies Profile.
 USL PDL Prospect Profile

1995 births
Living people
Honduran footballers
Honduran expatriate footballers
Association football forwards
Darton State Cavaliers men's soccer players
Tampa Bay Rowdies players
Tampa Bay Rowdies 2 players
South Florida Surf players
Reno 1868 FC players
New York Cosmos B players
New York Cosmos (2010) players
Oakland Roots SC players
Detroit City FC players
North American Soccer League players
National Premier Soccer League players
USL League Two players
USL Championship players
National Independent Soccer Association players
Expatriate soccer players in the United States
Sportspeople from Tegucigalpa
Espinal, Darwin